RK Swamy (1922 –2003) was an Indian advertising industry executive. He was involved in the setting up the Southern Operations of J. Walter Thompson's Indian associate [Hindustan Thompson Associates]. In April 1973 he founded R. K. Swamy Advertising Associates in Chennai and within the first few years set up operations in New Delhi, Mumbai, Bangalore, Kolkata and Hyderabad. The company was within the top ten agencies within the first five years of operations. The company then partnered with BBDO initially as a non equity partner in 1985 and then as a equity partner in 1990.  RK Swamy BBDO. Swamy was involved in making Madras an important location for the advertising industry. Swamy was also at the helm of various industry bodies, the Audit Bureau of Circulations and Advertising Agencies Association of India among them. He also started Hansa Vision, a television programming company.

Outside of his advertising career, Swamy spent time on Hindu religious and cultural activities, especially on restoration of temples and other historical structures.

In 2009, the All India Management Association established the AIMA-R K Swamy High Performance Brand Award in his honour.

His son Srinivasan Swamy became Chairman & Managing Director after his demise while the other son Shekar Swamy assumed the role of CEO of RK Swamy BBDO.

References

Bibliography and further reading

1923 births
2003 deaths
Indian advertising people
Businesspeople from Chennai